Horse Brook may refer to:

 Horse Brook (Beaver Kill tributary), in New York
 Horse Brook (Queens), a buried stream in New York City
 Horse Brook (Trout Brook tributary), in New York